Brandwood could refer to:

Brandwood, Shropshire
Brandwood (ward), Birmingham
Brandwood End, Birmingham